Carl Martin Gunnar Wallström Milkéwitz (born 7 July 1983) is a Swedish television and film actor. A successful actor in his home country, he is best known internationally for his 2015 American debut role as Tyrell Wellick in the USA Network cyber-thriller Mr. Robot.

Early life and education 
Martin Wallström was born on July 7, 1983 in Uddevalla, Sweden. Wallström began his professional acting career as a teenager, and later decided to study acting; he enrolled in the University of Gothenburg's Academy of Music and Drama in 2004, and graduated in 2008.

Career 
Since 1998, Wallström has worked almost entirely in Swedish television and film, as well as other Nordic and German productions. He began his career at age fifteen in the Swedish film Hela Härligheten.

In 2008, Wallström had a small role in the wide-release Swedish film Arn: The Kingdom at the End of the Road (Arn - Riket vid vägens slut). The following year, he made his debut in the Johan Falk film franchise in the film Johan Falk: GSI - Gruppen för särskilda insatser; he reprised this role in the following Johan Falk film Johan Falk - Vapenbröder which was released the same year.

In 2010, Wallström starred opposite Bill Skarsgård in the Swedish film Simple Simon. The film was recognized internationally and was shortlisted for that year's Academy Award for Best Foreign Language Film. In 2013, he starred in Easy Money III: Life Deluxe, the third installment of the very successful trilogy starring Joel Kinnaman. He also starred in the Swedish romantic comedy Ego that year.

In October 2014, it was announced that Wallström had joined the main cast of the US television thriller Mr. Robot; this was his US television debut and his most prominent international role to date. Wallström was cast as Tyrell Wellick, an ambitious Swedish technology executive for E Corp that works with the main character Elliot, played by Rami Malek. Wallström won the role of Wellick by submitting three self-tapes to the show. The first episode of the series premiered on June 24, 2015. Although credited as a main cast member for all four seasons of the show, he does not appear on-screen in about one-third of its episodes.

Outside of Mr. Robot, Wallström's other English-language roles include as Martin in the 2014 Swedish film Remake (in both Swedish and English), Tomas in the 2015 internationally co-produced English-language television drama 100 Code, a 2017 voice-acting role in an episode of the Comedy Central show Jeff & Some Aliens, and in supporting roles in the World War II drama Ashes in the Snow and independent science-fiction film Parallel, both released in 2018.

Additionally, Wallström has narrated many audiobooks in Swedish. As of the end of 2019, he has narrated thirty-two books.

Personal life 
Wallström was married to Swedish actress Lisa Linnertorp. The two have a son named Arvid and a daughter named Lilla, born in 2013 and 2019.  He currently lives and works primarily in Stockholm, Sweden.

Wallström speaks Swedish and English.

Filmography

Television

Music videos

References

External links

1983 births
People from Uddevalla Municipality
Living people
Swedish male film actors
Swedish male television actors
Gothenburg